Homosexuality has no recorded history in Bangladesh. Bangladesh was under British rule till 1947 and was known as ‘East Bengal’; the Partition of India made East Bengal the East Pakistan – a Muslim majority nation with moderate Islamic valued people. The culture of Bangladesh is influenced by both Bengali and Islamic ideologies, where homosexuality is absent, or present with homophobia and ignorance/silence about it. Bengalis have always been conservative and prohibition-minded regarding any kind of romance and sexuality. Any kind of sexuality whether it is homosexual or heterosexual along with romance has always been viewed negatively and repressed in Bangladeshi society.

The Muslim Rule in Bengal
Muhammad bin Bakhtiyar Khalji was the first Muslim who conquered Bengal in 1204 A.D., his reign was responsible for displacement of Hinduism by Islam, though Buddhism was little active before he came. Bakhtiyar's rule started the Islamic rule in Bengal, roots of the Bengal Sultanate and the Mughal Bengal were created from Bakhtiyar's reign. Homosexuality was not an official punishable offence during Muslim regime. A 14th century Bengali folklore tells the story of homosexual relationship between two widows.

British period
The Battle of Plassey led to the end of Muslim rule in Bengal; the British East India Company sat in the governance. Till the Indian Rebellion of 1857, the company rule was active and in 1858 British Raj was established all over India when Queen Victoria took responsibility of India directly. In 1860 Thomas Babington Macaulay made a law against homosexuality which is known as Section 377 of the Indian Penal Code, which was modelled after Buggery Act of 1533 of England.

Bengali Renaissance occurred in 19th century and early part of the 20th century, though it was limited only between Bengali Hindus of West Bengal; homosexuality was never mentioned positively by anyone in this period, no one tried talk on behalf of homosexuality, though female homosexuality never come under punishment according to the British law. Some Hindu writers e.g. Ishwar Chandra Gupta and Jagadish Gupta wrote on behalf of lesbianism.

Pakistan period
Bengali Muslims created their homeland known as East Pakistan according to the Lahore Resolution of 1940. From the British period to the Independence of Pakistan no Bengali Muslim writer wrote anything on behalf of homosexuality. On the other hand, the old Section 377 of the Indian Penal Code was active in the Penal Code of Pakistan. Constitution of Pakistan of 1956 and Constitution of Pakistan of 1962 continued the British law regarding homosexuality which is criminalized according to the law.

1950s decade saw the introduction of Pakistani Bengal's film industry; 'Mukh O Mukhosh' (1956) was the first Bengali film made in East Pakistan which represented conservative  heterosexual marriage, from the year of 1956 to 1960s decade all films were made in the same way. Bengali Muslim literature sector also started to grow expeditiously during this period; Pakistan was created as a Muslim nation, so Bengali Muslim writers and poets were given priorities rather than top Hindu Bengali writers who were prominents from the British period. British period's Muslim writers e.g. Kazi Nazrul Islam's writings were publicised. No Muslim Bengali intellectual is known to have written anything on behalf of homosexuality during Pakistan period of Bangladesh. Progressive values in educated Bengali Muslim society was to possess heteronormative values. In 1960s decade there were reports to have some brothels in Dhaka University's adjacent areas e.g. the Shahbag area, where Bacha bazi (sexual abuse on young adolescent males) was observed but adult homosexuality was not seen; Homosexuality remained taboo throughout 1947 to 1960s decade and to 1971 in which year Bangladesh seceded from Pakistan.

Independent Bangladesh
Bangladesh got itself as a separate country from Pakistan in 1971. In 1972 Constitution of Bangladesh was created where the old Section 377 was also entered. Though people for homosexuality were never seriously punished in independent Bangladesh. Bangladeshi Bengali language-newspapers published some poems, short stories and novels by some writers in 1970s but controversies were created and as a result the newspaper didn't again publish those things; books published by them were also banned for homoerotic content, e.g. Daud Haider’s homoerotic poem was banned. In 1980s and 1990s and also in 2000s Bangladeshi brothels contained male homosexual prostitutes.

In the 21st century Bangladesh, society still remained homophobic and transphobic. However, there are many organizations which advocated homosexuality and transgender rights like ‘Bandhu Social Welfare Society', ‘Bengayliz’, and ‘Boys of Bangladesh’. In 2014, a magazine called ‘Roopbaan’ was published for the first time in Bangladesh's history which focused on homosexual romance but it quickly stopped its publication as its chief editor Xulhaz Mannan was murdered in 2016 by local Islamic fundamentalists and Bangladeshi government had vowed that, homosexuality to be remained as illegal.

In May 2017, 28 suspected male homosexual youths were arrested in Keraniganj Upazila, Dhaka by Rapid Action Battalion, however, charges against them were on the grounds of drug abuse law. Also in 2013, a young Muslim girl of 20 named Sanjida was arrested by Police for loving, marrying and eloping with another girl, though charges against homosexuality was not brought here also and Sanjida was released from prison very shortly, she was falsely accused for abducting her lover named 'Puja', a Hindu girl.

Transgenders or Hijras get a very few rights in Bangladesh.

See also
LGBT rights in Bangladesh

References

Bibliography

 
 
 

 
 

Bangladesh
Social history of Bangladesh